Mircea Tiberian (born May 4, 1955 in Cluj, Romania) is a jazz musician and professor of music at the National University of Music in Bucharest. He coordinates the Jazz Department, which he set up in 1991.

Musical career
Tiberian spent his childhood and adolescence in Sibiu, Transylvania where he made his debut at the International Jazz Festival in 1974. He holds a doctorate in music. He currently lives in Bucharest. He has performed the world over with such musicians as Larry Coryell, Tomasz Stanko, Herb Robertson, John Betsch, Ed Shuller, Nicholas Simion, Adam Pierończyk, Maurice de Martin, Theo Jörgensmann and the Romanians Johnny Raducanu, Aura Urziceanu, Anca Parghel and Dan Mandrila.

Awards
Composers Union Award (1990, 1996, 2000, 2003)
Romanian Musician of the Year Award (2003, 2007, 2008)
The Enescu-Brancusi Scholarship granted by the Romanian Cultural Institute

Publications
Tehnica Improvizatiei in Muzica de Jazz (A Course of Improvisation Techniques), Editura UNMB, Bucharest, 2005
Notes on Music and Music Notes (book and CDs), Editura Muzeului National al Literaturii Romane, Bucharest, 2005
Cartea de muzica (An anthology of musicology studies), Editura Tracus Arte, Bucharest, 2008

Intercultural Projects
Liniada (2000), Agnus Dei (2001), Les annes folles de Bucharest (2004), Jazz and Cinema (2005 –present), Dark (2006), Eurotique (2006), Jazzy Tarot - musical (2007–2008) – theatre Metropolis Bucuresti

Discography
Magic Bird (Electrecord, 1990)
Never Ending Story (Blue Label, 1992)
Working Underground (Prima Records, 1994)
Alone in Heaven (Intercont, 1998)
Hotel of Three Beginnings (Intercont, 1999)
Interzone (Editura Casa Radio, 2000)
Interzone plays with Adam Pieronczyk (Not Two, 2001)
Crossing Atlas 45 (Not Two, 2002)
Eleven (Jazz and More, 2002)
Back to my Angel (Editura Muzicala, 2002)
Viata Lumii (Jazz and More, 2003)
Lumini (La Strada, 2003)
Palindrome (Jazz and More, 2004)
Shining of the Abyss (Jazz and More, 2004)
Notes on Music and Music Notes – double CD anthology (Editura Muzeului National al Literaturii Romane, 2005)
Dark (Editura Muzeului National al Literaturii Romane, 2006)
November (Openart Records, 2008)
Ulysses (Openart Records, 2008)

References
Mircea Tiberian's Biography (RO)
Mircea Tiberian's Discography

  

1955 births
Living people
Romanian jazz pianists
21st-century pianists